Bahamas competed at the 2017 World Championships in Athletics in London, United Kingdom, 4–13 August 2017.

Medalists

Results

Men
Track and road events

Field events

Women
Track and road events

Field events

Nations at the 2017 World Championships in Athletics
World Championships in Athletics
Bahamas at the World Championships in Athletics